Make Bradford British is a British television documentary  programme broadcast on Channel 4 that looks at the level of integration between Muslim and non-Muslim communities in Bradford, West Yorkshire.

It has two episodes, first broadcast on 1 and 8 March 2012.

The Council leader of Bradford City Council criticised the programme as reinforcing the idea that Bradford is deeply segregated.

Channel 4 aired a similar documentary, Make Leicester British, on 3 November 2014.

References

External links

2012 British television series debuts
2012 British television series endings
British documentary television series
Channel 4 original programming
Documentary films about race and ethnicity
Islam in England
Television shows set in Bradford